João Pereira may refer to:
João José Pereira (born 1987), Portuguese triathlete
Jamba (footballer) (born 1977), Angolan footballer
João Pereira (footballer, born 1984), Portuguese right back
João Pereira (footballer, born 1990), Portuguese central defender
João Carlos Pereira (born 1965), Portuguese football manager
João Pereira (swimmer) (1905–1984), freestyle swimmer from Brazil
José João Pereira (born 1981), East Timorese footballer
João Pereira dos Santos (1917–2011), capoeira mestre